Djair Terraii Carl Parfitt-Williams (born 1 October 1996) is a Bermudian professional footballer who plays as a forward for Ilves and the Bermuda national team.

Career

West Ham United

Born in Hamilton, Bermuda, Parfitt-Williams joined West Ham after being scouted at age 14 in California while playing for MLS academy San Jose Earthquakes by former West Ham player Clyde Best. On 2 July 2015, Parfitt-Williams made his first team debut in a 3–0 home victory at the Boleyn Ground over Lusitans in the UEFA Europa League, replacing Mauro Zarate after 74 minutes. He was first included in a West Ham matchday squad for their Premier League fixture against Aston Villa at Villa Park on 26 December 2015, remaining as an unused substitute as they drew 1–1. On 25 April 2016 he scored the 90th-minute winner in the U21 Premier League Cup final that West Ham won 1–0. Coming off injury, Parfitt-Williams scored in the EFL Trophy match against the League One side Northampton Town, which finished 1–1 with West Ham winning on penalties.

Rudar Velenje
In February 2018, Parfitt-Williams joined the Slovenian PrvaLiga side NK Rudar Velenje.

Ahead of the 2020 season, Parfitt-Williams joined Úrvalsdeild side Fylkir and scored his first goal for the club in a 4-1 win over KA in July 2020.

Dover Athletic
On 19 February 2022 Parfitt-Williams joined National League club Dover Athletic on non-contract terms. On 25 April 2022, Parfitt-Williams was announced to have left the club.

On 26 August 2022, Parfitt-Williams joined Veikkausliiga side Ilves on a deal until the end of the year with an option to extend for a further year.

Personal life
On 22 June 2016, Parfitt-Williams was involved in a motorcycle accident during a visit to Bermuda where he suffered a bruised hip and road rash on both arms when the bike he was travelling on as a passenger collided with a car.

References

External links 

1996 births
Living people
People from Hamilton, Bermuda
Bermudian footballers
Bermuda international footballers
Bermudian expatriate footballers
Association football forwards
West Ham United F.C. players
NK Rudar Velenje players
Fylkir players
Dover Athletic F.C. players
Slovenian PrvaLiga players
Úrvalsdeild karla (football) players
National League (English football) players
Expatriate footballers in Slovenia
Expatriate footballers in Iceland
Ilves players
Expatriate footballers in Finland
Bermudian expatriate sportspeople in England